Nunca Tem Fim... is the ninth and final studio album by Brazilian band O Rappa. It was released August 15, 2013 in Brasil and distributed through Warner Music. Produced by Tom Saboia and mastered by Stephen Marcussen (Aerosmith, Nirvana, Paul McCartney) in California.

In 2014 the album was nominated to Latin Grammy for Best Brazilian Rock Album.

Track listing

Personnel 
O Rappa
 Marcelo Falcão - lead and background vocals, acoustic guitar, beatbox on "Cruz de Tecido", handclaps
 Xandão - electric guitar, percussion
 Lauro Farias - bass, handclaps
 Marcelo Lobato - keyboards, piano, synthesizers, vibraphone, bassoon, celesta, gong, glockenspiel, melodica, samplers, steel drum, tambura, theremin

Additional musicians
 Felipe Boquinha - drums, timbales on "O Horizonte é Logo Ali" and "Fronteira"
 Tom Sabóia - electric guitars, percussion, handclaps
 Negralha - samplers on "Auto-Reverse", "Fronteira" and "Anjos"
 Marcos Lobato - slide and dobro on "Boa Noite Xangô", additional synths on "Um Dia Lindo"
 Zé Nobrega, Doguinha, JBF - additional handclaps on "Auto-Reverse"
 Thiago Osório - tuba and flute on "Doutor, Sim Senhor"
 Luiz Carlos Evan - saxophone on "Doutor, Sim Senhor" and "Sequência Terminal"
 Davi Pinheiro Gomes, Léo Antunes - trombone on "Doutor, Sim Senhor" and "Sequência Terminal"
 Enéas Gomes - trumpet on "Doutor, Sim Senhor" and "Sequência Terminal"
 Alexandre Duayer - tremolo guitar on "Sequência Terminal"
 Pedro Selector - trumpet on "Um Dia Lindo"

Technical
 Tom Sabóia - production, mixing
 O Rappa - production
 Stephen Marcussen - mastering
 Zé Nobrega - assistant engineer: Estúdio Jimo
 Alexandre Duayer - assistant engineer: Estúdio Caroçu, guitar tech: Xandão
 Wellington Marques - assistant engineer: Estúdio Caroçu
 Sérgio Santos - assistant engineer: Toca do Bandido
 Rafaela Prestes - assistant engineer: Toca do Bandido on "Boa Noite Xangô"

Artwork
 Mike Deodato, Jr. - artwork, illustration
 Leonardo Iza - colors, illustration
 Eduardo Francisco - booklet illustration: DJ and black-and-white
 Gabriel Wiokbolo - photography
 Klaus Vluller - photography assistant
 Bira Farias - graphic project

References

O Rappa albums
2013 albums